Prochoerodes truxaliata is a species of geometrid moth in the family Geometridae.

The MONA or Hodges number for Prochoerodes truxaliata is 6977.

It has also been released in Australia for the biological control of Baccharis halimifolia.

References

Further reading

 

Ourapterygini
Moths described in 1858
Lepidoptera used as pest control agents